Chad L. Coleman (born September 6, 1967) is an American actor. He is perhaps best known for playing Dennis "Cutty" Wise on the HBO series The Wire (2004–08), Tyreese on the AMC series The Walking Dead (2012–15), Mingo on Roots (2016), Z on the FX sitcom It's Always Sunny in Philadelphia (2010–19), Fred Johnson on The Expanse (2015–20), Klyden on The Orville (2017–present), and Bruno Mannheim in Superman & Lois (2023). He also voiced Coach in the video game Left 4 Dead 2 (2009).

Early life
Coleman was born in Richmond, Virginia. After being removed from neglectful parents in the Fairfield Court public housing project (one source says Creighton Court), he was raised by a grandmother on Richmond's south side after some time in a foster home. As a youth, he participated in track and field, but turned his attention to drama after a leg injury. He attended Virginia Commonwealth University on a scholarship for his freshman year, before dropping out to serve in the U.S. Army. During his service, from 1985 to 1989, he worked as a video cameraman.

Career

Coleman had a starring role on the HBO series The Wire as reformed criminal Dennis "Cutty" Wise. In 2002, Coleman starred as O. J. Simpson in TNT's television movie Monday Night Mayhem.

Coleman also had a guest role in the Terminator: Sarah Connor Chronicles TV series on Fox. He also had a small role in Carlito's Way: Rise to Power. Coleman was also involved with the development of Left 4 Dead 2, as a voice actor for the character Coach. In 2009, Coleman appeared in a revival of August Wilson's play Joe Turner's Come and Gone on Broadway and also had a starring role in the Norwegian TV series Buzz Aldrin, What Happened To You In All The Confusion?, based on the novel by Johan Harstad. The series aired in Europe in November 2011.

He guest starred in the In Plain Sight episode "Whistle Stop" as an ex-boxer/witness suffering from pugilistic dementia, and in the Lie to Me episode "The Canary's Song" as a coal miner. He has also guest starred in five episodes of It's Always Sunny in Philadelphia between 2010 and 2019 as the character "Z". In 2011, he began playing Gary Miller, the ex-husband of Nikki Miller and father of manipulative daughter Mackenzie, in the Fox television sitcom I Hate My Teenage Daughter.

From late 2012 to early 2015, Coleman played Tyreese on AMC's post-apocalyptic horror series The Walking Dead. In the third season, Tyreese was a recurring character. Coleman was upgraded to series regular and main cast member at the start of the fourth season and retained this status for its fifth season until his character was killed off in the mid-season premiere. On November 20, 2014, he was announced to play Fred Johnson, a.k.a. "The Butcher of Anderson Station", a former Marine caught in a power struggle between Earth and Mars on the science-fiction series The Expanse.

Coleman also played Mingo in the 2016 re-imagining of Roots, on the History Channel. Mingo is a stern, no-nonsense slave/cock trainer for Tom Lea, who keeps the Lea plantation afloat. He befriends Chicken George and they bond like father and son.

Additionally, Coleman is executive producer, as well as visual inspiration for the character Mr. Osi of the futuristic graphic novel series Treadwater.

In 2016, he played the role of Tobias Church on Arrow. Currently, he is playing the recurring role of Klyden, Second Officer Bortus's mate, on The Orville, which debuted in the fall of 2017 and entered its second season at the end of 2018.

Personal life
Coleman was married to Sally Stewart from 1999 to 2010.

On May 1, 2015, Coleman was recorded in the middle of a rant on New York City's 4 subway train. He stated that the rant was prompted by "built-up frustration" stemming from the death of Freddie Gray.

Later that year, he created a PSA with the non-profit organization Living Advantage about how people can help foster children besides adopting them.

Filmography

Film

Television

Video games

References

External links

 

American male film actors
Living people
Male actors from Richmond, Virginia
20th-century American male actors
21st-century American male actors
United States Army soldiers
African-American male actors
American male television actors
Virginia Commonwealth University alumni
1974 births
American male video game actors
American male voice actors
Theatre World Award winners
20th-century African-American people
21st-century African-American people